Logan County is a county in the southwest Pennyroyal Plateau area of the U.S. Commonwealth of Kentucky. As of the 2020 census, the population was 27,432. Its county seat is Russellville.

History
The county is named for Benjamin Logan, who had been second in command of the Kentucky militia during the American Revolutionary War and was a leader in bringing statehood to the area. Created from Lincoln County on September 1, 1792, Logan was the 13th Kentucky county in order of formation. Its original territory stretched from the Mississippi in the west to the Little Barren River in the east, and from the Green and Ohio Rivers in the north to the Tennessee border on the south; since then, 28 other counties have been formed within that area. The settlement of Logan Court House was made the county seat at its incorporation under the name Russellville.

Future President Andrew Jackson fought a pistol duel against Charles Dickinson at Harrison's Mill in Logan County on May 30, 1806. Jackson was seriously wounded and Dickinson was killed.

During the post-Reconstruction period, there was considerable racial violence by white mobs against black citizens in Logan County. Racist mobs lynched 12 African Americans in the county during the years between 1877 and 1908; most were killed around the turn of the 20th century. This is a higher total than in all but one other county in the state. Four men were killed in a mass lynching on August 1, 1908, in Russellville, during the civil unrest associated with the Black Patch Tobacco Wars. Sharecroppers Joseph Riley, and Virgil, Robert, and Thomas Jones, the last three members of the same family, were all hanged from the same cedar tree. They were the last persons lynched in Logan county.

Logan was a major tobacco-growing county, with Dark Fired Tobacco produced by a special smoke processing. From 1906 some of its farmers became involved in the violent Black Patch Tobacco Wars, joining the Dark Tobacco District Planters' Protective Association of Kentucky and Tennessee to mobilize against the monopoly power of the American Tobacco Company, which had driven down prices to where farmers could barely make a living. Paramilitary Night Riders threatened other tobacco planters to "persuade" them to join the PPA. In late 1907 and early 1908, hundreds of Night Riders conducted raids against tobacco warehouses in some Kentucky towns. They struck Russellville on January 3, 1908, taking over the city and dynamiting two tobacco factories.

21st century
In 2009, the Logan County/Russellville Little League Baseball team won the Little League World Series Great Lakes Regional Tournament as the 4th team from Kentucky to do so (as of 2017, Kentucky has had seven teams win the Great Lakes Tournament) to represent the Great Lakes Region in the Little League World Series.

Geography
Logan County is on the south border of Kentucky; its south line abuts the north line of Tennessee. Its low hills are completely devoted to agriculture or urban development. Its highest point ( ASL) is Rainbow Rock Knob WSW, located  ESE from Russellville. The Red River flows northwestward through the central and west part of the county, discharging into Todd County on the west.

Adjacent counties

 Muhlenberg County - northwest
 Butler County - north
 Warren County - northeast
 Simpson County - southeast
 Robertson County, Tennessee - south
 Todd County - west

Lakes
 Briggs Lake
 Boy Scout Lake
 Lake Herndon
 Lake Malone (part)

Demographics

2000 Census
As of the census, of 2000, there were 26,573 people, 10,506 households, and 7,574 families in the county. The racial makeup of the county was 90.70% White, 7.62% Black or African American, 0.21% Native American, 0.17% Asian, 0.01% Pacific Islander, 0.33% from other races, and 0.96% from two or more races. 1.08% of the population were Hispanic or Latino of any race.

There were 10,506 households, out of which 33.30% had children under the age of 18 living with them, 57.20% were married couples living together, 11.20% had a female householder with no husband present, and 27.90% were non-families. 25.00% of all households were made up of individuals, and 11.40% had someone living alone who was 65 years of age or older. The average household size was 2.50 and the average family size was 2.96.

The county population contained 25.70% under the age of 18, 8.40% from 18 to 24, 28.50% from 25 to 44, 23.60% from 45 to 64, and 13.80% who were 65 years of age or older. The median age was 37 years. For every 100 females there were 93.10 males. For every 100 females age 18 and over, there were 90.40 males.

The median income for a household in the county was $32,474, and the median income for a family was $39,307. Males had a median income of $29,750 versus $20,265 for females. The per capita income for the county was $15,962. About 10.80% of families and 15.50% of the population were below the poverty line, including 20.50% of those under age 18 and 18.60% of those age 65 or over.

Communities

Cities
 Adairville
 Auburn
 Lewisburg
 Russellville (county seat)

Unincorporated places

 Chandlers Chapel
 Corinth
 Dot
 Dunmor (partially in Muhlenberg County)
 Epleys
 Gasper
 Gordonsville
 Hilltop
 Hollow Bill
 Keysburg
 Lickskillet
 Olmstead
 Richelieu
 Schochoh
 South Union
 Whipporwill

Attractions
 Lake Malone State Park
 Red River Meeting House
 Shaker Museum at South Union

Notable people
 Philip Alston, counterfeiter and early settler near Russellville
Jim Bowie
Green Pinckney Russell (1861–1939), American school administrator and teacher

Politics

See also

 National Register of Historic Places listings in Logan County, Kentucky
 News Democrat & Leader, local newspaper

References

 
Kentucky counties
1792 establishments in Kentucky
Populated places established in 1792